Ganesh Thapa is an ex president of the All Nepal Football Association (ANFA). He was formerly the president of the South Asian Football Federation and the vice president of Asian Football Confederation (AFC).

Family
Thapa is the younger brother of politician Kamal Thapa.

Background
Before becoming the president of ANFA, Thapa was a national football player and captain. He played for the East Bengal FC in the Calcutta Football League. He also played in the Dhaka League for Mohammedan SC, Rahmatganj MFS and Dhaka Wanderers.

Changes to the Nepali football made under Thapa
 Started the already stopped ANFA Martyr's Memorial A-Division League
 Created ANFA Youth Academy
 Gave special focus to youth football
 Tried to make Nepali Football League system more professional
 Development of Nepali Football
 Better facilities and better rewards for players

Corruption case
Following the corruption case of Mohammed bin Hammam. British newspaper “The Sunday Times” reported that All Nepal Football Association (ANFA) president Ganesh Thapa had received £115,000 from the banned president of Asian Football Confederation and FIFA’s executive committee. The Associated Press revealed that Thapa received an illegal gift of $100,000 from bin Hammam in 2009. The money was deposited into the personal bank account of Thapa's son, Gaurav Thapa.

Thapa later claimed that he borrowed the money for his personal use, and such a revelation would not tarnish the image of Nepal and Nepali football.

In November 2015 the FIFA Ethics Committee banned him for 10 years. Thapa, who was also a member of Nepal’s parliament, appealed the decision at the Court of Arbitration for Sport.

In 2016, Mani Kunwar, Thapa's brother-in-law, became vice president of ANFA.

In 2017, Thapa stated that as far as the corruption case was concerned, he had already received clean chit in Nepal, and that time would prove that he was innocent in relation to cases outside Nepal.

Honours

Nepal
 South Asian Games Silver medal: 1987

References

Football people in Nepal
Nepalese sports executives and administrators
Living people
Place of birth missing (living people)
Nepalese footballers
Nepal international footballers
All Nepal Football Association
Mohammedan SC (Dhaka) players
Banned sportspeople
1960 births
Association footballers not categorized by position
Expatriate footballers in Bangladesh
Nepalese expatriate footballers
Nepalese expatriate sportspeople in India
Members of the 2nd Nepalese Constituent Assembly
South Asian Games medalists in football
South Asian Games silver medalists for Nepal
Association football executives